Ion-Marcel Ciolacu (born 28 November 1967) is a Romanian politician who currently serves as the leader of the Social Democratic Party (PSD) and President of The Chamber of Deputies.

Previously little known politician outside of Buzău County, Ciolacu came into national prominence when he was became the deputy prime minister in 2018 in the cabinet of Prime Minister Mihai Tudose. Initially given this office allegedly in order and report of Todose activities to Liviu Dragnea, who had been unable to become prime minister himself and was wary of Tudose becoming a power player in the party, Ciolacu soon broke with Dragnea and became an ally of Tudose against Dragnea's leadership. After Tudose's Resignation, Ciolacu was marginalized within PSD but still retained the leadership of PSD Buzău.

Ciolacu once more returned to prominence in 2019 after Liviu Dragnea had been convicted on abuse of office and incitement to intellectual forgery charges, having to serve a 3 years, 6 months sentence. With the Social Democrats still controlling a majority both in the Chamber and in the Senate, Ciolacu won the position the President of the Chamber of Deputies, with 172 votes for and 120 against, previously held by Dragnea himself. 

Following new PSD leader Viorica Dăncilă overwhelmingly defeat in the 2019 Romanian presidential election, on 26 November 2019, Ciolacu was named leader of the party, firstly ad-interim, until he was confirmed in the position by the party congress the next year on 22 August 2020 with an overwhelming 1310–91 margin against his opponent.

Ciolacu led the party to its victory in the 2020 Romanian legislative election but was not able to form a majority coalition in the new legislative. Other parties opposed to the PSD formed a new coalition on 23 December and formed the new government, thus pushing Ciolacu's PSD in opposition. However, in 2021, following the political crisis that led to the collapse of the Cîțu Cabinet, he managed to bring the PSD back to the government, forming a cabinet with its former rival, the National Liberal Party, thus forming the pro-presidential National Coalition for Romania.

He has been described as adhering to the ideology of left-wing nationalism and social conservatism. He opposes same-sex marriage and social progressivism.

Early life and education
Marcel Ciolacu was born in Buzău as the son of Ion Ciolacu, a career military pilot. In 1995 he obtained a law degree from the Ecological University of Bucharest, which was authorized in May 1995. In 2008 he attended a program in Security and National Defence at the National College of Defence in Bucharest, a controversial university, regarded by some Romanian publications as a "diploma-factory". In 2012 he completed a master's programme in the Management of the Public Sector at the National University of Political Studies and Public Administration.

Political career

Early Political Activity
Marcel Ciolacu has become a member of the National Salvation Front in 1990. During the early nineties, Ciolacu climbed the steps in local politics and by 1996 he became the second-in-command of the Youth Organization of the party. Senator Ion Vasile became his godfather to his child. He remained little known, however, until the mid-2000s. In 2005 he was for several months the interim prefect of Buzau, after which he became, in turn, director of Urbis Serv and deputy mayor of Buzau (2008-2012). As deputy mayor when Constantin Boșcodeală was mayor of Buzau (1996–2016). Boșcodeală was later convicted in 2015 for abuse of office during the period 2002–2008, by diverting public funds to a football team and other private companies of which he was a shareholder.

Ciolacu entered national politics in 2012 when he was first elected for a deputy seat in Parliament. In 2015 he was elected PSD president for Buzău County, replacing Boșcodeală who stepped down while being investigated. Ciolacu's election was controversial. He ran against Senator Vasile Ion, who eventually withdrew from the race, accusing Ciolacu of rigging the internal elections. Ciolacu was re-elected to Parliament in 2016.

As Deputy Prime Minister
In 2017, Ciolacu was named deputy prime minister in the cabinet led by Mihai Tudose. Tudose's predecessor, Sorin Grindeanu was ousted from his position by a vote of no-confidence initiated by PSD itself, then under leadership of Liviu Dragnea.  Grindeanu's departure did not leave Dragnea's power unquestioned. Previously, the government had held a 295 majority, now it was reduced to a mere 241. For the first time, Dragnea was facing strong dissent in the party at the prospect that President Klaus Iohannis would not name another PSD member to become prime minister, electing instead to force early elections. Since the procedure of calling early elections laid down in the Constitution of Romania is complicated and difficult to trigger, and seeing PSD still had the necessary majority to form another government, the president decided to name Mihai Tudose, Dragnea's newest proposal as prime minister. Tudose was not, however, Dragnea's first choice and the PSD leader needed to find ways to control him better than Grindeanu, who had shown him that the office of prime minister was strong enough to allow its holder to wrestle his power in the party away from him. For this reason, Ciolacu was named deputy prime minister in the Tudose Cabinet, in order to become Dragnea's ears in the government.

Like Tudose himself and Grindeanu before him, however, Ciolacu did not stay loyal to Dragnea for long. By the autumn of 2017, Ciolacu had entered Tudose's grasp and was now fully loyal to the prime minister. The relationship between Tudose and Dragnea started deteriorating rapidly, as had been the case with Grindeanu, but the two maintained publicly that there was no strain between them. By then, Ciolacu was firmly in the Tudose camp.

Tudose soon declared publicly that there was only one person whom he would not tolerate being removed from his cabinet: Ciolacu. In January 2018, Tudose attempted to take full control of his government by asking the resignation of his Interior minister, Carmen Dan, a Dragnea mouthpiece and loyal lieutenant. As it became quite apparent that this was another power struggle between the prime minister and the leader of the PSD, Ciolacu publicly positioned himself in the Tudose camp. Dragnea once again convened a special party meeting in order to force Tudose's resignation. Seeing that a majority of the party remained loyal to Dragnea, Tudose decided to resign to evade a motion of no confidence like his predecessor. Ciolacu handed in his own resignation from the government shortly thereafter.

First election to the Chamber presidency
After leaving the Executive, Ciolacu returned to his deputy seat in Parliament. Throughout 2018 and the first half 2019 he stayed out of the spotlight while persisting in the opposition against Dragnea's leadership. In October 2018, the press reported an alleged physical altercation in Parliament between Ciolacu and Dragnea, but both denied the claim.

On 27 May 2019, Liviu Dragnea was convicted of abuse of power and sentenced to three years and six months in prison. This vacated his position as President of the Chamber of Deputies and his leadership position in the party. Ciolacu emerged once more in the public eye, seeking a path to top party leadership. The party's new leader, Viorica Dăncilă, the third prime minister named by Dragnea, was now looking for ways to cement her leadership of the party. For this, she sought the support of Ciolacu and other former opponents of Dragnea. Ciolacu accepted her offer to sponsor him as president of the Chamber of Deputies, succeeding Dragnea himself. On 29 May 2019, Ciolacu was voted the new head of the Chamber. However, his election was won only narrowly and with the support of the PSD-breakaway party, PRO Romania, and its member, former Prime Minister Mihai Tudose.

As leader of the Social Democratic Party (PSD)
As leader of the Lower Chamber, Ciolacu kept a reserved and non-vocal stance. In October 2019, a motion of no confidence was initiated by the PNL-led opposition that successfully removed Dăncilă from power, even though Ciolacu maintained that the Dăncilă Cabinet would not fall. He  supported Viorica Dăncilă's bid to the presidency of Romania but after her defeat and her historically weak result, Ciolacu went on to take control of the party. 

On 25 November 2019, one day after the presidential election, Marcel Ciolacu personally visited Dăncilă at her home, event at which has been speculated in the Press Marcel Ciolacu asked her to resign from the party's leadership, offering her an MP seat in the next legislative election but which has been denied by Ciolacu, Paul Stănescu and Dăncilă herself.On the 26th of November, after a six hour long meeting of the Executive Committee of PSD, Viorica Dăncilă resigns as Party Leader, with Marcel Ciolacu acting as Leader and Paul Stănescu as General Secretary following this.

Ciolacu was expected to run for a full term as leader of PSD at its Congress on February 29, 2020, but the Congress was postponed to March 21 due to the emergence of COVID-19 pandemic in Romania. In early March, they announced plans to move the Congress online in light of the epidemic-related ban of gatherings of more than 1000 people. Ultimately, the Congress took place on 22 August 2020 and resulted in Ciolacu's election as leader of PSD, defeating Eugen Teodorovici on an overwhelming 1310–91 margin.

Controversies

Mecan Construct Investigation
In 2009, the Court of Accounts Buzau found that a construction company in the municipality of Buzau, Urbis Serv, headed by Marcel Ciolacu between 2007 and 2008, caused an approximately €1.3 million overcharge for street and sidewalk construction projects through an illegal contract with a company owned by a party colleague. The company, Mecan Construct, was owned by former PSD County Councilor Dumitru Dobrică.

Ciolacu was accused of conflict of interest causing damages to the municipality by inflating the Mecan contract by approximately 1.3 million euros.

Marcel Ciolacu stated that the ruling of the Buzău Court of Accounts was challenged in court. He stated that a criminal investigation file at the National Anticorruption Directorate Ploiești, in which the allegations regarding the contract with Mecan Construct were investigated, concluded without starting criminal proceedings against him.

Relationship with Omar Hayssam
Marcel Ciolacu was involved in a media scandal in May 2015 after a 20-year-old photograph of him with Omar Hayssam appeared in the press. In approximately 2005, Ciolacu and Hayssam had been attending a hunting party organized by the Buzau Forestry Directorate. In 2006, Omar Hayssam masterminded the kidnapping and holding for ransom of three Romanian journalists in Iraq, for which Hayssam was convicted in 2007 by the Bucharest Court of Appeal to 24 years, four months imprisonment. In addition, there was evidence that Ciolacu appeared on a list of Hayssam's debtors: In the early 2000s, Hayssam appears to have loaned Ciolacu 200 million old lei (20,000 RON). As a result of the scandal, Prime Minister Victor Ponta removed Ciolacu from the position of honorary adviser to the prime minister.

References

|-

|-

1967 births
People from Buzău
Councillors in Romania
Deputy Prime Ministers of Romania
Living people
Presidents of the Chamber of Deputies (Romania)
Members of the Chamber of Deputies (Romania)
Members of the Romanian Orthodox Church
Prefects of Romania
Presidents of the Social Democratic Party (Romania)
Social Democratic Party (Romania) politicians